Črniče is a village in the Vipava Valley in the Municipality of Ajdovščina in the Littoral region of Slovenia.

The parish church in the settlement is dedicated to Saint Vitus and belongs to the Koper Diocese.

References

External links 

Črniče at Geopedia

Populated places in the Municipality of Ajdovščina